The Parliament of Sierra Leone is unicameral, with 124 seats. Each of the country's fourteen districts is represented in parliament. 112 members are elected concurrently with the presidential elections; the other 12 seats are filled by paramount chiefs from each of the country's 12 administrative districts. Members of Parliament of Sierra Leone are address as the Honourable.

The incoming members to the Sierra Leone House of Parliament, after the result of the just concluded 2012 Parliamentary elections will be made up of two political parties (with three seats still yet to be decided)  with the following representations : the All People's Congress (APC) 67 seats, the Sierra Leone People's Party (SLPP) 42 seats .

Below is a list of the incoming Sierra Leone members of Parliament, based on the final results of the 2012 Sierra Leone Parliamentary elections.

Eastern Province
Kailahun District:

Kenema District:

Kono District:

Southern Province

Bo District:

Bonthe District:

Moyamba District:

Pujehun District:

Northern Province

Bombali District:

Kambia District:

Koinadugu District:

Port Loko District:

Tonkolili District:

Western Area
Western Area Urban District:

Western Area Rural District:

Sources: http://www.nec-sierraleone.org/index_files/Parliamentary_OMP_PCMP%20Result%202012.pdf

Government of Sierra Leone